Alexander or Aleksandr Makarov may refer to:

Aleksandr Makarov (javelin thrower) (born 1951), javelin thrower
Aleksandr Viktorovich Makarov (born 1978), soccer goalkeeper
Aleksandr Vladimirovich Makarov (born 1978), Russian soccer midfielder
Aleksandr M. Makarov (1906–1999), director of Ukrainian rocket factory Yuzhmash
Aleksandr Makarov (footballer, born 1996), Russian football (soccer) midfielder
Alexander Makarov (ice hockey, born 1962), Russian ice hockey player
Alexander Makarov (ice hockey, born 1989), Russian ice hockey player
Alexander Alexandrovich Makarov (1857–1919), Imperial Russian politician
Alexander Alexeyevich Makarov (born 1966), Russian inventor in the field of mass spectrometry
Alexander Sergeyevich Makarov (born 1946), mayor of the city of Tomsk, Russia